Dash Dolls is an American reality television series that premiered on the E! cable network, on September 20, 2015. The show is a spin-off of Keeping Up with the Kardashians. The series features a group of young female employees, referred to as Dash Dolls, working in the Dash boutique in Hollywood which is owned by the Kardashian sisters.

Production

Development 
The series was greenlit on March 26, 2014. The show is broadcast on E!, an American cable network which features mostly entertainment-related programming and reality television series. The network has ordered eight hour-long episodes. The show is the sixth series installment in the Keeping Up with the Kardashians franchise, following Kourtney and Khloé Take The Hamptons, and the first one not featuring any members of the Kardashian family as the main cast. The series is produced by Bunim/Murray Productions and Ryan Seacrest Productions, the same companies which produce Keeping Up with the Kardashians and their spin-offs; Gil Goldschein, Jeff Jenkins, Farnaz Farjam and Claudia Frank serve as executive producers, along with the Kardashian sisters and Kris Jenner. The network describes the premise of the show as:

Dash is a chain of retail stores which was founded in 2006 by the Kardashian sisters. There are several stores operating in the United States; the reality series is set in a boutique located in West Hollywood, which was opened in 2012 when the store was relocated from its original location in Calabasas, California. On April 5, 2015, the network aired an episode of Keeping Up with the Kardashians involving a storyline which featured the Dash dolls for whom Khloé Kardashian organized a teambuilding retreat; Molly Mulshine of The New York Observer noted that the episode "conveniently introduced to the future stars of Dash Dolls." The sneak peek of the show was released on May 31, 2015. Malika Haqq, one of the main cast members of the show, discussed the development of the show by saying:

Haqq and her twin sister Khadijah had served as co-managers of the retail store before the television series occurred. "We did not put out any signs like ‘Yo we want a show.’ It didn't happen like that. Khloé and Kourtney asked us if we could help them out. [...] They needed somebody that they could trust," Malika Haqq discussed doing business with the Kardashians. Haqq also noted that working in the store has always resembled a television show because of its unique environment and famous owners. "Ultimately when you put a large group of girls together, you're game to get a bunch of drama," Haqq also added. Kim Kardashian has disclosed that she initially wanted Keeping Up with the Kardashians to focus more on their stores in order to bring people's attention and later said that she "didn’t think it would turn into what it turned into."

Cast 

The reality series chronicles the daily life of the employees working in one of the Dash boutiques. The show features Khloé Kardashian’s best friend Malika Haqq, who has also been appearing on Keeping Up with the Kardashians, and her twin sister, Khadijah Haqq, who both act as co-managers of the store. The cast also includes store's merchandising manager Durrani Aisha Popal, sales associates Stephanie De Souza, Caroline Burt, Taylor Cuqua, and Melody "Mel" Rae Kandil, assistant manager Nazy Farnoosh, store manager Jennifer Robi, sales coordinator  Alexisamor "Lexi" Ramierz, and media and marketing expert Melissa "Missy" Flores. The Kardashian sisters, who own the store, are also expected to make guest appearances throughout the show. According to the press release issued by the network, the cast of the series is characterized as:

Episodes

Reception 

Amy Amatangelo, reviewing the show for The Hollywood Reporter, showed very little excitement by saying that "you've seen everything here before," and noticed very much resemblance to other reality television series, including "The Real Housewives, The Real World and the mother ship: Keeping Up with the Kardashians." Amatangelo also noted "lots of staged conversations and conflicts" and "beyond awkward" product placement. Mark Perigard from Boston Herald said that "the franchise may have at last hit bottom," judging the show prior to its premiere.

Broadcast 
The show premiered on September 20, 2015, in the United States on the E! cable network at 9/8pm ET/PT, following a new episode of Keeping Up with the Kardashians. The series continued to air on every Sunday night in the same timeslot. The show finished airing its eight-episode season on November 8, 2015. The series is  additionally broadcast on local versions of the network worldwide; in Australia the series premiered on September 22, and in the United Kingdom on September 27, 2015. All the episodes are also available in numerous streaming video on demand services, including Amazon Video, iTunes, Google Play, and Microsoft Movies & TV.

See also 

 Kourtney and Khloé Take Miami
 Kourtney and Kim Take New York
 Khloé & Lamar

References

External links 
 
 
 

2010s American reality television series
2015 American television series debuts
2015 American television series endings
Television series by Bunim/Murray Productions
Television series by Ryan Seacrest Productions
Television shows set in Los Angeles
English-language television shows
Keeping Up with the Kardashians
Reality television spin-offs
E! original programming
American television spin-offs
Women in Los Angeles